Krasnyi Lyman is a village in Alchevsk Raion (district) in Luhansk Oblast of eastern Ukraine, at about 30 km NW from Luhansk.

The settlement was taken under control of pro-Russian forces during the War in Donbass, that started in 2014.

References

Villages in Alchevsk Raion